

Economics 

Decoupling and re-coupling during financial crises is typified by the decoupling hypothesis that, in 2007, held that Latin American and Asian economies, especially emerging ones, had broadened and deepened to the point that they no longer depended on the United States economy for growth, leaving them insulated from a slowdown there, even a fully fledged recession.

Faith in the concept had generated strong outperformance for stocks outside the United States. However, over the course of 2008, as fears of recession mounted in the United States, worldwide stock markets declined heavily. Contrary to the decoupling hypothesis, the losses were greater outside the United States, with the worst experienced in emerging markets and developed economies like Germany and Japan. Exports make up especially large portions of economic activity in those places, but that fact was not supposed to matter anymore in a decoupled world because domestic activity was thought to be so robust.
On the other hand, after the slump the emerging countries experienced a strong recovery, much stronger than that in advanced economies.

The phenomenon of decoupling and re-coupling has been explained by observing that global demand for factors such as capital and raw material declines when one part of the world economy suffers a crisis, which benefits the remaining healthy parts of the world economy through lower interest rates and lower commodity prices.  However, once the crisis reaches the stage where global lenders suffer significant losses, they will cut back on their loan supply and interest rates for everybody will rise.

Organization theory 

In organizational theory, decoupling refers to the creation and maintenance of gaps between formal, symbolic policies and actual organizational practices on the ground. In contrast, recoupling is a process by which previously decoupled policies and practices become coupled, leading to substantive, rather than symbolic, compliance. Thus, recoupling is a process of organizational ritual becoming reality, of pretense becoming practice. Studies on re-coupling (or coupling) suggest that "the initially created gaps between policy and practice may not be permanent: that is, policies and practices that were once decoupled may eventually become coupled."

References 

Great Recession
Organizational theory